Michal Hubínek (born 10 November 1994) is a Czech professional footballer who plays as a midfielder for Polish club Bruk-Bet Termalica Nieciecza.

Club career
He made his senior league debut for Bohemians 1905 on 23 June 2015 in a Czech First League 3–2 home win against Viktoria Plzeň. He scored his first senior league goal on 17 October 2015 in a Czech First League home draw against Zbrojovka Brno.

On 5 October 2020, he joined Bruk-Bet Termalica Nieciecza in Poland on a season-long loan.

References

External links 
 
 Michal Hubínek official international statistics

1994 births
Living people
Czech footballers
Czech Republic under-21 international footballers
Association football midfielders
Bohemians 1905 players
FK Mladá Boleslav players
Bruk-Bet Termalica Nieciecza players
Czech First League players
Ekstraklasa players
I liga players
Czech expatriate footballers
Expatriate footballers in Poland
Sportspeople from Třebíč